The 1965 Giro d'Italia was the 48th running of the Giro d'Italia, one of cycling's Grand Tour races. The Giro started in San Marino, on 15 May, with a  stage and concluded in Florence, on 6 June, with a  leg. A total of 100 riders from 10 teams entered the 22-stage race, which was won by Italian Vittorio Adorni of the Salvarani team. The second and third places were taken by Italian riders Italo Zilioli and Felice Gimondi, respectively.

Teams

Ten teams were invited by the race organizers to participate in the 1965 edition of the Giro d'Italia. Each team sent a squad of ten riders, which meant that the race started with a peloton of 100 cyclists. From the riders that began the race, 80 made it to the finish in Florence.

The teams entering the race were:

Route and stages

The race route was revealed to the public on 25 March 1965 by race director Vincenzo Torriani. San Marino hosted the start of the race, which marked the first time in race history that the race began outside of Italy. The small country only hosted the stage's start as the stage concluded in Perugia.

Classification leadership

One jersey was worn during the 1965 Giro d'Italia. The leader of the general classification – calculated by adding the stage finish times of each rider – wore a pink jersey. This classification is the most important of the race, and its winner is considered as the winner of the Giro.

The mountains classification leader. Certain climbs were given different categories based on their difficulty, which each awarded different levels of points for each category. The first riders to the top of the climbs were awarded points. Although no jersey was awarded, there was also one classification for the teams, in which the teams were awarded points for their rider's performance during the stages.

Final standings

General classification

Mountains classification

References

Citations

 
1965
Giro d'Italia
Giro d'Italia
Giro d'Italia
Giro d'Italia
1965 Super Prestige Pernod